Ali Heidar Ali Mohamed is a Kuwaiti judoka. He competed at the 1980 Summer Olympics and the 1992 Summer Olympics.

References

Year of birth missing (living people)
Living people
Kuwaiti male judoka
Olympic judoka of Kuwait
Judoka at the 1980 Summer Olympics
Judoka at the 1992 Summer Olympics
Place of birth missing (living people)